Cyperus rotundus, known as musta in ayurvedic medicine
Mosta, Malta
an album by Pate Mustajärvi